William Paul Bray (born June 5, 1983) is an American former professional baseball pitcher. He played in Major League Baseball (MLB) for the Washington Nationals and Cincinnati Reds.

Amateur career
A native of Virginia Beach, Virginia, Bray attended Ocean Lakes High School in Virginia Beach. He is a graduate of the College of William and Mary. In 2003, he played collegiate summer baseball for the Orleans Cardinals of the Cape Cod Baseball League.

Professional career

Washington Nationals
The left-handed William Bray was the 13th overall selection in the 2004 draft by the former Montreal Expos franchise which relocated to Washington, D.C. and was renamed the Washington Nationals. Bray made his Major League debut on June 3, 2006, against the Milwaukee Brewers in Milwaukee, earning a 1-pitch win.

Cincinnati Reds
Almost a month later, on July 13, 2006,  Bray, along with infielders Royce Clayton and Brendan Harris, reliever Gary Majewski and starter Daryl Thompson were traded to the Cincinnati Reds for outfielder Austin Kearns, infielder Felipe Lopez and pitcher Ryan Wagner.

Bray began the 2009 season with the Triple-A Louisville Bats after failing to earn a spot on the Reds' roster. After only a few games in Louisville, Bray underwent Tommy John surgery to repair his left elbow and missed the rest of the year. Bray was called up from Triple-A Louisville June 27, and made his 2010 debut with the Reds on June 28, 2010, pitching one inning vs the Philadelphia Phillies.

In six seasons with the Reds, with 2008 and 2011 being his best, Bray's record was 12–11 with a 3.72 ERA while striking out 172 in 174.1 innings in 258 appearances. On November 8, 2012, Bray elected free agency after a disappointing 2012 season in which he only pitched in 14 games.

Return to Washington
On December 3, 2012, Bray returned to the Nationals on a minor league contract. He went to spring training with the Nationals, but on March 4, 2013, he was cut and sent back to their minor league camp.

Bray announced his retirement via his Twitter account on March 16, 2014.

Coaching career
In 2015, Bray returned to Orleans of the Cape Cod Baseball League to serve as the pitching coach for his former team.

Personal

Bray and his wife, Elaine, were married on December 2, 2006. They have three daughters and one son.

Following baseball, he returned to William & Mary to finish his undergraduate degree in finance. He graduated in May 2015, and began attending William & Mary law school that fall. He has also written multiple articles for Sporting News.

In 2012, Bray shaved his head in an effort to raise funds for pediatric cancer.

References

External links

1983 births
Living people
Sportspeople from Virginia Beach, Virginia
Baseball coaches from Virginia
Baseball players from Virginia
Major League Baseball pitchers
Washington Nationals players
Cincinnati Reds players
William & Mary Tribe baseball players
Orleans Firebirds players
Cape Cod Baseball League coaches
Brevard County Manatees players
New Orleans Zephyrs players
Harrisburg Senators players
Potomac Nationals players
Sarasota Reds players
Lynchburg Hillcats players
Louisville Bats players
Dayton Dragons players
Peoria Javelinas players
William & Mary Law School alumni
Virginia lawyers
21st-century American lawyers